Bossoms Boatyard is located opposite Port Meadow, Oxford, England, on the bank of the River Thames.

History
The yard was managed by the Bossom family from about 1830 until 1945, when the last in a line of several generations retired from the family business. Boats continue to be built by the company at this site to this day.

Bossoms was one of the first boat builders to develop the use of GRP for hulls. They specialise in building both sailcraft and craft with electric motors and are one of the few boat builders still in existence that exhibited at the first ever London Boat Show.

Boats
Some of the craft built by Bossoms include:

 The Vertue (yacht)
 The Bosun (dinghy)
 The Minisail (dinghy)
 The Admiralty Sailing Craft (ASC) 16 foot dinghy
 Electric boats and various launches.

See also
 Medley Sailing Club

References

External links
 Bossoms Boatyard website

Year of establishment missing
Shipyards on the River Thames
Buildings and structures in Oxford
Boatyards
Boat builders